Tucson station is an Amtrak train depot in Tucson, Arizona, served three times a week by the Sunset Limited and Texas Eagle trains.

History
The depot was built in 1907 by the Southern Pacific Railroad (SP).  It was designed by the SP's architect, Daniel J. Patterson, who designed a number of depots during the same era, including the San Antonio Station.

Passenger services
In the mid-20th century, into the latter 1950s, four trains a day departed west and four trains a day went east:
 Departing west toward Los Angeles Union Station via Yuma in the morning:
 Argonaut (bypassed Phoenix to the south) (to ca. 1957)
 Sunset Limited (passed through Phoenix) (continues to operate today)
 Departing west toward Los Angeles Union Station via Phoenix and Yuma in the mid-afternoon and the evening:
 Imperial (to 1958)
 Golden State (to 1968)
 Departing east toward Chicago's LaSalle Street Station via the Golden State Route in the midnight hours:
 Imperial
 Golden State
 Departing east toward New Orleans Union Station via the Sunset Route and Houston in the daylight morning hours:
 Sunset Limited
 Argonaut

Recent decades
In 1998, the City purchased the entire depot property from the Union Pacific Railroad, which had absorbed the SP. Restoration of the main depot building and the three adjacent buildings, to their 1941 modernized Spanish Colonial Revival architectural style, was completed in 2004. Spanish Colonial Revival elements include the stuccoed brick walls, red clay roof tiles, and colorful, decorative tilework in the waiting room. The station and other railroad buildings are included as contributing resources to the National Register-listed Tucson Warehouse Historic District.

The Old Pueblo Trolley extended their historic streetcar line to the depot in 2009. Sun Link assumed operation of the line on July 25, 2014.
The Southern Arizona Transportation Museum is located in the old Records Vault building.

Wyatt Earp and Doc Holliday statue

According to historian David Leighton, of the Arizona Daily Star, the Wyatt Earp and Doc Holliday statue near the train depot commemorates the revenge killing of Frank Stilwell. On March 18, 1882, in the aftermath of the Gunfight at the O.K. Corral, Morgan Earp was murdered by unknown killers, in Tombstone, Arizona.  Two days later, Wyatt Earp, Doc Holliday, and a few other men were escorting the injured Virgil Earp and his wife to Tucson, with their final destination being California. While at the Tucson train station, Wyatt Earp learned that Frank Stilwell, one of the individuals suspected in the Morgan Earp murder, was lurking in the area. Earp, Holliday, and the others pursued Stilwell along the train tracks, eventually catching and killing him.

References

External links

 Tucson Amtrak station information
 Southern Arizona Transportation Museum – at the Depot.
 Arizona Rail Passenger Association: Tucson Depot history
 USA Rail Guide: "Tucson Amtrak Station & El Paso and Southwestern Railroad Depot" – by Train Web.

Amtrak stations in Arizona
Transportation in Tucson, Arizona
Buildings and structures in Tucson, Arizona
Former Southern Pacific Railroad stations
Railway stations in the United States opened in 1907
Cultural depictions of Wyatt Earp
Cultural depictions of Doc Holliday
1907 establishments in Arizona Territory